Statistics of Swedish football Division 3 for the 2011 season.

League standings

Norra Norrland 2011

Mellersta Norrland 2011

Södra Norrland 2011

Norra Svealand 2011

Västra Svealand 2011

Södra Svealand 2011

Nordöstra Götaland 2011

Nordvästra Götaland 2011

Mellersta Götaland 2011

Sydöstra Götaland 2011

Sydvästra Götaland 2011

Södra Götaland 2011

Footnotes

References 

Swedish Football Division 3 seasons
5
Sweden
Sweden